Bigelow United Methodist Church is a historic Methodist church in Portsmouth, Ohio. It was built in 1858 in an Early Romanesque Revival style and added to the National Register of Historic Places in 1987. The building is now known as the Grace Community Church at Bigelow.

References

United Methodist churches in Ohio
Churches on the National Register of Historic Places in Ohio
Churches completed in 1858
National Register of Historic Places in Scioto County, Ohio
Portsmouth, Ohio
1858 establishments in Ohio